"Ich lebe" is a song by Austrian recording artist Christina Stürmer. It was written by Alexander Kahr, Eva Kraus, Harald Hanisch, and Leopold Zillinger for her debut studio album Freier Fall (2003), while production was helmed by the former. Recorded after her participation in the ORF 1 talent show Starmania, where Stürmer had finished runner-up, it was released by Polydor Records on 24 March 2003 in Austria, where it debuted at number-one on the Austrian Singles Chart and remained atop for another seven weeks.

In 2005, a slightly re-written version of "Ich lebe", featuring additional lyrics by Frank Ramond and Maya Singh as well as new production by Thorsten Brötzmann, preceded the release of Stürmer's album Schwarz Weiss, her first venture into the German and Swiss music markets. This version peaked at number four on the German Singles Chart, and reached number 21 in Switzerland. It was eventually certified gold by Bundesverband Musikindustrie (BVMI).

Music video 
In the music video for "Ich lebe", Stürmer and her band are performing in a white room and as she sings about various things, shots of those things are shown...

Tracks

Original version 
 "Ich lebe" (Radio Version)
 "Ich lebe" (Unplugged)
 "Ich lebe" (Karaoke Version)

Re-release 
 "Ich lebe" (Radio Version)
 "Ich lebe" (Live Version)
 "Ich lebe" (Instrumental Version)
 "Vorbei" (Live Version)

Charts

Weekly charts

Year-end charts

Certifications

References

External links
 

2003 debut singles
2005 singles
Christina Stürmer songs
Number-one singles in Austria
Songs written by Alexander Kahr
2003 songs